Jon David "J. D." Smart (born November 12, 1973) is a former Major League Baseball pitcher who played for the Montreal Expos and Texas Rangers. He played college baseball for the Texas Longhorns.

External links

1973 births
Living people
American expatriate baseball players in Canada
Baseball players from Texas
Cape Fear Crocs players
Delmarva Shorebirds players
Gulf Coast Expos players
Harrisburg Senators players
Major League Baseball pitchers
Montreal Expos players
Oklahoma RedHawks players
Ottawa Lynx players
People from San Saba, Texas
Texas Longhorns baseball players
Texas Rangers players
Vermont Expos players
West Palm Beach Expos players
Anchorage Glacier Pilots players
Westlake High School (Texas) alumni